Brèves de comptoir (Counter brief) is a 2014 French ensemble comedy directed by Jean-Michel Ribes.

Plot
The life of a small cafe in the suburbs, Swallow, it opened at six in the morning until closing.

Cast

 Chantal Neuwirth as The boss
 Didier Bénureau as The boss
 Régis Laspalès as Mussel
 Yolande Moreau as Madame Lamelle
 Valérie Mairesse as Madame Pelton
 André Dussollier as The politician
 François Morel as Pivert
 Michel Fau as The writer
 Laurent Stocker as Monsieur Laroque
 Philippe Chevallier as Monsieur Latour
 Samir Guesmi as Couss
 Daniel Russo as Jacky
 Laurent Gamelon as Rubens
 Dominique Pinon as A taxi
 Grégory Gadebois as A taxi
 India Hair as The greedy woman
 Bruno Solo as Bolo
 Alexie Ribes as Gigi
 Michelle Bréant as Virginie
 Marcel Philippot as Monsieur Rabier
 Annie Grégorio as The postwoman
 Olivier Saladin as Pulmoll
 Dioucounda Koma as Dakar
 Dominique Besnehard as Chorister
 Alban Casterman as Monsieur Jean
 Jean-Toussaint Bernard as The funeral employee

References

External links

2014 films
2014 comedy films
French comedy films
2010s French-language films
2010s French films
2000s French films